Amend as a verb means to change or modify something, as in:
Constitutional amendment, a change to the constitution of a nation or a state
Amend (motion), a motion to modify a pending main motion in parliamentary procedure

Amend as a surname may refer to:

 Bill Amend (born 1962), American cartoonist
 Eric Amend (born 1965), American former tennis player
 Rolf-Dieter Amend (1949–2022), East German slalom canoeist

See also

 Amend, Iran (disambiguation), places in Iran
 "Amends" (1998), episode 10 of season 3 of the television show Buffy the Vampire Slayer
 Amend: The Fight for America (2021), an  American docuseries on the Fourteenth Amendment to the United States Constitution